Dana Glacier is in Wenatchee National Forest in the U.S. state of Washington and is  west of Dome Peak. An arête divides the glacier in two while other aretes separate Dana Glacier from Chickamin and Dome Glaciers to the east and south respectively.

See also
List of glaciers in the United States

References

Glaciers of the North Cascades
Glaciers of Chelan County, Washington
Glaciers of Washington (state)